Stiletto (Tom Stuart) is a fictional character appearing in American comic books published by Marvel Comics.

Publication history

Stiletto first appeared in Hero for Hire #16 in Dec. 1973 and was created by Tony Isabella and Billy Graham.

Fictional character biography
The eldest son of Tyler Stuart, a warden at Seagate prison, Tom Stuart was an intelligent young man with a bright future ahead of him. When Tyler lost his job after Luke Cage escaped, Tom sought revenge. He obtained a costume and an arsenal from Justin Hammer and became the criminal vigilante Stiletto. Stiletto found Cage and used explosive flechettes to destroy the building he was in. Cage was able to save the civilians in the building and battled Stiletto. Using many different types of knives, including a cryogenic stiletto, he was able to hold Cage at bay, but the super-hero outmatched him. Stiletto fled and vowed to get his revenge another day.

Soon after, Stiletto returned with his younger brother Tim, who took the codename Discus, as his partner. Together, they battled Luke Cage, but were inevitably defeated. Tyler Stuart appeared and saved his sons from Cage, convincing him that he'd handle the situation. However, they ambushed Cage once again later, during Cage's exoneration. Cage's allies, Iron Fist and the Daughters of the Dragon aided him in the battle, and soon Misty Knight and her partner, Rafael 'Rafe' Scarfe also joined in. Stiletto fired one of his stiletto blades at Rafe, apparently killing him. Misty, enraged, shot at Stiletto, aiming for his head. Luke Cage grabbed the bullet before it hit Stiletto, but defeated him and his brother. The projectile blade Stiletto fired at Rafe was blocked by his police badge, saving his life.

Much later, both Stiletto and Discus were seen in Justin Hammer's employ. Attempting to capture Iron Man, Stiletto and Discus attacked but were easily defeated after their weapons were unable to harm him. While in prison, Stiletto and his brother had apparently found religion and decided to live a life of peace. Their peaceful life didn't last, as soon they found themselves working for Deadly Nightshade. Along with the Eel and Man Mountain Marko, Stiletto and Discus battled the Heroes for Hire during a robbery. After Nightshade's defeat, Stiletto and Discus surrendered, no longer wishing to fight the heroes.

A partnership began with the Sphinx and Justin Hammer brought Stiletto back to villainy. Along with Hammer's villain army, Stiletto battled Spider-Man and Namorita, but he was defeated by both of them. He also attended the AIM Weapons Expo with several other super-villains. Eventually, he rejoined forces with Nightshade, this time without his brother.  Nightshade's plan was to kill Black Panther, but interference from Luke Cage, Iron Fist, the Falcon, and Black Goliath put a stop to their scheme, and they easily defeated Stiletto and the other villains hired by Nightshade.

During the Civil War storyline, Stiletto was seen in Hammerhead's unnamed supervillain army. However, Iron Man and S.H.I.E.L.D. forces attacked their forces.

Stiletto appeared in Brand New Day as one of the villains at the Bar with No Name.

Powers and abilities
Stiletto has no superpowers but wields knives and shoots small blades from wrist devices.

References

External links
 

Characters created by Billy Graham
Characters created by Tony Isabella
Comics characters introduced in 1973
Fictional knife-fighters
Fictional mercenaries in comics
Marvel Comics supervillains